{{DISPLAYTITLE:C17H17ClN6O3}}
The molecular formula C17H17ClN6O3 (molar mass: 388.81 g/mol, exact mass: 388.1051 u) may refer to:

 Eszopiclone
 Zopiclone

Molecular formulas